Kuduro (or kuduru) is a type of music and dance from Angola. It is characterized as uptempo, energetic, and danceable. Kuduro was developed in Luanda, Angola in the late 1980s. Producers sampled traditional carnival music like soca and zouk béton ("hard" zouk) from the Caribbean to Angola, techno and accordion playing from Europe and laid this around a fast 4/4 beat.

The kuduro is similar to the kizomba rhythm.

Origins
The roots of kuduro can be traced to the late 1980s when producers in Luanda, Angola started mixing African percussion samples with zouk béton ("hard" zouk) and soca to create a style of music then known as Batida ("Beat"). European and American electronic music had begun appearing in the market, which attracted Angolan musicians and inspired them to incorporate their own musical styles. Young producers began adding heavy African percussion to both European and American beats. In Europe, western house and techno producers mixed it with house and techno. Kuduro is primarily a genre of electronic dance music. In addition to the aforementioned influences, Kuduro also incorporates regional styles that are based on global and local influences that highlight sonic expressions of personal and collective identities. These collective and personal identities were formed due to Angola's turbulent history.

The history of kuduro has come about in a time of Angolan civil unrest, and provided a means of coping with hardship and positivity for the younger generation. Angola experienced periods of war, repression, and some instances of political tranquility. The origin of Kuduro came from and due to this political instability. There was significant anti-colonial resistance to Portuguese rule and influence which created a transitional government composed of two political parties. These two parties engaged in power-based struggles and tensions that led to the Angolan Civil War. Such shift in attitude away from optimism was reflected through Kuduro's increasing distortion in timbre and hardened aesthetics, while lyrics of the genre often reflected experiences of life in the musseques (Luanda’s informal, unpaved and marginal neighborhoods).

Kuduro's establishment of collective and individual identities created stereotypes of Africanness that permeate the Western mind. With the strong immigration to Portugal of Angolan citizens kuduro spread and evolved further in the neighborhoods of Lisbon, with the inclusion of additional musical elements from genres of Western European electronic music, giving origin to the progressive kuduro. This also allowed Kuduro to spread in terms of popularity as it became increasingly available to more populations. The youth also became a large part of the influence and spread of Kuduro. With the increase in popularity of electronic music in periods of relative political tranquility, youth played Kuduro in side-street markets, local parties, and nightclubs.

While listenership is primarily Angolan, there are some sonically diaspora communities and niche communities across a wide range of age groups that enjoy, experience, and produce Kuduro. Technology, global citizenships and intercultural communities impact the evolution of the genre as it has endured various "generations" of sound. Each of the three Kuduro generations lasted nearly a decade. Kuduro also endured various tempo fluctuations over time as well as the presence or absence of vocals and the distortion or clarity of sound.

Kuduro’s hybridity directly reflects its technological evolution; the music was codified in its constitutive technology. For example, contemporarily, kuduro vocals are rendered with relative low fidelity. This is a trace of the genre’s early technological limitations as early 1990s Angola studios lacked the necessary technology to record vocals. Furthermore, early producers created batidas in direct conversation with their techno and house influences and thus kuduro is predominantly loop-based and instrumental (ibid). These composition choices demonstrate how music styles arise as active negotiations of imagination and availability; these choices are both the result of “technical limitations and creative decisions” (ibid). The technology continues to define the music when one unfolds the history of the Fruity Loops drum samples. As the Civil War abated, instating a coalition government between UNITA and MPLA, the Angolan economy liberalized and there was a wider availability of personal computers (ibid). This resulted in DIY kuduro production using the Fruity Loops interface, which democratized the enterprise of creating batidas (ibid). The Fruity Loops interface is described by Garth Sheridan in the following manner:  The Fruity Loops interface is centred on a row of on/off controls for each sound, known as the step sequence that resemble the user interface of the Roland TR series of drum machines. In the default 4/4 setting these 16 controls represent 4 bars of quarter notes. Drums, samples and software synthesisers are controlled using the step sequencer and, in later versions, also a digital piano roll. These loops could then be arranged and burned onto CD or recorded to tape.This production source unified the kuduro sound so it coalesced into an identifiable entity: “Producers using Fruity Loops had created the archetypal kuduro rhythms (see Fig. 1) and timbres”. Software availability also contributes to the ideological connotations surrounding the genre as the accessibility of these technologies lowered the barrier to entry to kuduro production, and thus the genre became increasingly working class and vulnerable to denigration as it became associated with Angola's mousseques (ibid).

According to Tony Amado, self-proclaimed creator of Kuduro, he got the idea for the dance, after seeing Jean-Claude Van Damme in the 1989 film Kickboxer, in which he appears in a bar drunk, and dances in a hard and unusual style. As Vivian Host points out in her article, despite the common assumption that "world music" from non-Western countries holds no commonalities with Western modern music, Angolan kuduro does contain "elements in common with punk, deep tribal house, and even Daft Punk." And although Angolan kuduro reflects an understanding and an interpretation of Western musical forms, the world music category that it fits under, tends to reject the idea of Western musical imperialism. DJ Riot of Sistema said, "Kuduro was never world music… It wasn’t born on congas and bongos, as some traditional folk-music. It was kids making straight-up dance-music from, like, ’96. Playing this new music, this new African music, that feels straight-up political in itself."

Kuduristas use body movements that often emanate movement/stillness, incoordination, falling, pop & lock, and breakdancing. This style of dance seems to “break down” body parts into isolations and staccato movements, serving as a reflection of debility and the mixture of abled/disabled bodies in performance. Popular Angolan dancer Costuleta, whose leg has been amputated, is known for his captivating performances displaying dexterity and sexuality. The incorporation of debility complicates normative notions of “abled-ness” while recalling motifs of black survival throughout the diaspora, specifically in relation to the land mines planted after Angola's war of independence that has left many Angolans amputated. Kuduristas contort their bodies in direct response to their spatial environments: Kuduristas, acutely aware of the six to twenty million landmines still waiting to be detonated, as well as the fact that one out of every 334 Angolans has lost a limb as a result of landmine detonation, emulate to various degrees the movements of the land mine victims around them, and are themselves victims.Young also argues that kuduristas use their dancing “to signify on the normative landscape of the black body,” and by extension, their spatial order. Acts of oppression (colonialism) and violence have composed their environments as sites of subjugation, but these dancers influence the essence of their settings by taking up space and recasting it through their bodies and movement.

Terminology
The name of the dance refers to a peculiar movement in which the dancers seem to have hard buttocks ("Cu Duro" in Portuguese), simulating an aggressive and agitated dance style.

Generations of kuduro 
There were three primary generations of kuduro that each lasted nearly a decade. Through all generations, the primary common vein was storytelling of social and political messages. These messages are innately representative of the diaspora as it spreads the influence of Africanness transnationally, using African-originated and influenced sounds as a global genre.

The first generation 
The first generation began in the early 1990s. It consisted primarily of middle-class youth and was representative of influences that resulted from political unrest. Artists and producers experimented with localized versions of techno and house music which aligned with much of the music that already permeated the club scene. It ranged from 128-135 beats per minute and vocals were rarely used to convey the message of the music. Kuduro in this generation also favored synthesized productions of acoustic instruments.

The second generation 
This generation had a 'do it yourself' aesthetic which expanded the industry through establishing lower-income neighborhoods as the center of production. By this time, many home studios were based around Fruity Loops which were sequencers that incorporated a range of synthesizers and samples. The increase in availability of computers and pirated technology, especially the music production software FruityLoops made kuduro more widely available to the masses for production. This generation was characterized by sped-up versions of the first generation's tempo at 140 beats per minute. "Urgent" vocal styles were used in kuduro songs during this generation.

The third generation 
This generation, too, focused on more neighborhood-based performance. There was an increase in participatory aspects in this genre as well. The use of Afrohouse and N'dombolo both had slower beats represented the globally connected nature of the genre. This generation also had slower beats. Technologically, this generation marked a shift away from FL Studio as the primary means of production to sequence-based software such as Cubase or Logic Pro.

Popularity
Kuduro is very popular across former Portuguese overseas countries in Africa, as well as in the suburbs of Lisbon, Portugal (namely Amadora and Queluz), due to the large number of Angolan immigrants.

In the Lisbon variety (or progressive kuduro), which mixes kuduro with house and techno music, Buraka Som Sistema a Portuguese/Angolan electronic dance music project based in Portugal, was responsible for the internationalisation of kuduro, presenting the genre across Europe. It featured in several international music magazines, after their appearance with their hit "Yah!" ("Yeah!"). Buraka Som Sistema takes its name from Buraca, a Lisbon suburb in the municipality of Amadora. Since the explosion of the Buraka Som Sistema, kuduro dance performance videos find an increasing audience on internet video platforms like YouTube. The videos range in quality from MTV standard to barely recognizable mobile-phone footage.

I Love Kuduro (festival)

A travelling festival that has become known as one of the largest gatherings dedicated to the Kuduro genre and lifestyle. It was created by Angolan artist Coréon Dú in 2011 with premiere events in the Showcase Club in Paris followed Arena Club in Berlin under the name Kuduro Sessions. It included Angolan legends such as Noite e Dia, Nacobeta, Bruno M, DJ Znobia, Big Nelo, the then up and coming Titica, Francis Boy Os Namayer, DJ Djeff & DJ Sylivi, as well as with a slew of international guests / Kuduro supporters such as Louie Vega & Anané Vega, Ousunlade, Daniel Haaksman, John Digweed, Hernan Cattaneo, Trentemoller, Tiefshwarz, Diego Miranda, and Wretch 32, among others.

The first event of Love Kuduro in Luanda was two day festival that received over 14,000 Kuduro fans in January 2012 at the Luanda International Fair grounds. The even has happened annually in Luanda, with various events happening around the world in cities such as Paris, Amsterdam, Stockholm, Rio de Janeiro, New York and Washington DC . Recent including a recent event at the 2014 TechnoParade in Paris, as the Os Kuduristas tour (a follow up to the Kuduro Sessions theme tour) which focused mainly on bringing the broader Luanda urban culture to Kuduro lovers around the world, with an emphasis on dance.

The most recent event was an I Love Kuduro pop up float at the 2014 TechnoParade in Paris.

I Love Kuduro (film)
The film I Love Kuduro directed by brothers Mário and Pedro Patrocínio and Coréon Dú premiered with great success at the International Film Festival of Rio de Janeiro, the largest film festival in Latin America, and at Portugal, in DocLisboa. I Love Kuduro was shot in Angola and presents the origin of the kuduro phenomenon.

M.I.A. has supported kuduro music, working on the song "Sound of Kuduro" with Buraka Som Sistema in Angola. "It initially came from kids not having anything to make music on other than cellphones, using samples they'd get from their PCs and mobiles' sound buttons," M.I.A. said of kuduro. "It's a rave-y, beat oriented sound. Now that it's growing, they've got proper PCs to make music on."

References

External links
 Long Academic Article on Kuduro
 Blog about Kuduro
 La Kiz
 Jayna Brown, Global Pop Music and Utopian Impulse, “Buzz and Rumble”

Portuguese music
African dances
Angolan culture
Angolan music
African electronic dance music